Vrbanja may refer to:

Vrbanja, Croatia, a village and a municipality in the Vukovar-Srijem County
Vrbanja (Banja Luka), a village in Bosnia and Herzegovina
Vrbanja (Bugojno), a village in Bosnia and Herzegovina
Vrbanja (Hadžići), a village in Bosnia and Herzegovina
Vrbanja (river), a tributary of the Vrbas in Bosnia and Herzegovina
Vrbanja bridge, former name of the Suada Dilberović and Olga Sučić bridge in Sarajevo, Bosnia and Herzegovina